Strontium ruthenate may refer to two compounds:

 Monostrontium ruthenate, SrRuO3, a ferromagnetic perovskite.
 Distrontium ruthenate, Sr2RuO4, a perovskite superconductor that does not contain copper.

Strontium compounds
Ruthenium(IV) compounds
Transition metal oxides